Hænsgardane or Hensgardane is a village in Vang Municipality in Innlandet county, Norway. Heensåsen Church is located in the village.

References

Vang, Innlandet
Villages in Innlandet